Chicherin is an old Russian noble family:

 Boris Chicherin (1828–1904) - Russian liberal jurist
 Georgy Chicherin (1872–1936) - Soviet foreign minister
 Nikita Chicherin (b. 1990) Russian soccer player
 Pyotr Aleksandrovich Chicherin (1788–1849) - Russian general
 Yulia Chicherina (b. 1978) - Russian rock singer
 Chicherin House

Russian-language surnames